Hanni Fries is a Swiss orienteering competitor who won a bronze medal in the relay at the World Orienteering Championships in Kongsberg in 1978, together with Ruth Baumberger and Ruth Humbel.

References

Year of birth missing (living people)
Living people
Swiss orienteers
Female orienteers
Foot orienteers
World Orienteering Championships medalists